The 1980–81 season was the 101st season of competitive football by Rangers.

Overview
Rangers played a total of 47 competitive matches during the 1980–81 season. The summer of 1980 saw Greig bring in Jim Bett from Lokeren for £150,000. Bett was joined by Colin McAdam a £165,000 signing from Partick Thistle. The side got off to a good start in the league, going on a fifteen match unbeaten run, including two Old Firm wins, was to end in November. A disastrous run in November and December all but ended the title challenge as the team finished third, twelve points behind champions Celtic.

The League Cup campaign was halted after a controversial defeat to Aberdeen in a match where the Dons were awarded two contentious penalties. Due to having no European participation, Rangers entered the Anglo-Scottish Cup which led to a defeat at the hands of English minnows, Chesterfield. The Third Division side held Rangers to a 1–1 draw at Ibrox before defeating Rangers 3–0 in the away leg at Saltergate. Rangers did win the 1981 Scottish Cup Final after beating Dundee United 4–1 in a final replay. After a tedious 0–0 draw where Ian Redford missed a last minute penalty, Rangers won the replay with goals from Davie Cooper, a John MacDonald double and Bobby Russell.

Results
All results are written with Rangers' score first.

Scottish Premier Division

Scottish Cup

League Cup

Anglo-Scottish Cup

Glasgow Cup

Appearances

League table

See also
 1980–81 in Scottish football
 1980–81 Scottish Cup
 1980–81 Scottish League Cup

References 

Rangers F.C. seasons
Rangers